Aimé Bonpland was a French explorer and botanist.

Bonpland may also refer to:

 Pico Bonpland, Venezuela's third highest peak
 Bonpland (crater), a lunar crater
 Lake Bonpland
 Bonpland willow
 Bonpland, Corrientes, a small town and municipality in Argentina